Big Creek Bridge was a historic structure located northeast of Madrid, Iowa, United States. The Marsh arch bridge was designed by Des Moines engineer James B. Marsh. It was completed in 1916. The bridge was listed on the National Register of Historic Places in 1998. The historic span was replaced by a new bridge in 2004.

References

Bridges completed in 1916
Bridges in Boone County, Iowa
Arch bridges in Iowa
Road bridges on the National Register of Historic Places in Iowa
National Register of Historic Places in Boone County, Iowa